Pseudochelatococcus lubricantis is a Gram-negative, rod-shaped and non-spore-forming bacteria from the genus of Pseudochelatococcus which has been isolated from coolant from a metal working emulsion in Germany.

References

Beijerinckiaceae
Bacteria described in 2015